This is a list of members of the Western Australian Legislative Assembly from 1971 to 1974:

Notes
 On 8 October 1971, the Labor member for Ascot and Speaker of the Assembly, Merv Toms, died. The Labor candidate, Mal Bryce, won the resulting by-election on 13 November 1971.
 On 26 October 1972, the Country member for Blackwood, David Reid, resigned to contest the seat of Forrest in the House of Representatives. Liberal candidate Sandy Lewis won the resulting by-election on 16 December 1972.
 On 28 February 1973, the Liberal member for Bunbury, Maurice Williams, resigned. Liberal candidate John Sibson won the resulting by-election on 7 April 1973.
 On 30 May 1973, the Labor member for Balcatta, Herb Graham, resigned following his appointment to the Licensing Court. Labor candidate Brian Burke won the resulting by-election on 28 July 1973.

Members of Western Australian parliaments by term